Abbé Pierre Antoine Simon Maillard (c. 1710 – 12 August 1762) was a French-born Roman Catholic priest.  He is noted for his contributions to the creation of a writing system for the Mi'kmaq indigenous people of Île Royale, Cape Breton Island, Canada.  He is also credited with helping negotiate a peace treaty between the British and Mi'kmaq people, which resulted in the Burying the Hatchet Ceremony (Nova Scotia). He was the first Catholic priest in Halifax and is buried in the St. Peter's Cemetery in downtown Halifax.

Early years
Maillard was born in the diocese of Chartres, France around 1710.  He received his ecclesiastical training at the Séminaire de Saint-Esprit in Paris.  In 1734 the Abbé de L'Isle-Dieu selected Maillard in a group of seminarists lent to the Séminaire des Missions Étrangeres, which was short of personnel.  After eight months in that institution, Maillard was selected (1735) for the Mi'kmaq missions on Cape Breton Island (called Île Royale at that time).  His recommendation letter stated "he is a young priest who has greatly edified us . . full of zeal and piety."

Maillard arrived at Fortress Louisbourg on the ship Rubis on 13 August 1735.  He worked extensively with the Mi'kmaq people.  He became a witness to, and eventually a reluctant participant in the ongoing struggles between French and British forces for control of the area.

Maillard quickly immersed himself in learning and becoming proficient in the language of the natives.  He also devoted himself to missionary work, visiting all the settlements on Île Royale, Île Saint-Jean (now called Prince Edward Island) and English Acadia (now called Nova Scotia).  He pleaded for additional assistance from his French superiors, who responded by sending Jean-Louis Le Loutre.  The two worked together on developing the written language.

In 1740 Maillard was appointed Bishop of Quebec's vicar-general for Île Royale.  In 1742 this position created friction between his superiors and the provincial of the Recollets of Brittany, who wanted his men to be independent of Maillard's control.  Maillard took every opportunity to criticize the conduct of those workers; his severity led Duquesnel (Le Prévost) and François Bigot to demand Maillard's recall, but Maillard's superior (Bishop Pontbriand) reached a compromise by dividing the vicar general's powers between Maillard and the superior of the Recollets in Louisbourg.  This arrangement continued until 1754, when Bishop Pontbriand confirmed Maillard in his functions as vicar general, which he exercised alone from that point on.

King George's War 
Along with Abbe Le Loutre, Maillard was involved in supporting the Mi'kmaq, French and Acadians throughout King George's War.  He was present when Annapolis Royal was under siege, and after the fall of Louisbourg in June 1745, Maillard encouraged Micmaq warriors to mount raids against British forces.

In the closing months of 1745 the British captured Maillard and sent him to Boston. From there he was deported to France. However, he quickly (1746) returned to Acadia on with the Duc d'Anville Expedition, which was coordinated with Father Le Loutre.  He took active part in military campaigns during the winter of 1746-47 directed by Jean-Baptiste-Nicolas-Roch de Ramezay, such as the Battle of Grand Pre.

Father Le Loutre's War 

During Father Le Loutre's War, Maillard encouraged the Mi'kmaq declaration of war against the British.  Maillard was involved with resisting the founding of Halifax, Nova Scotia in the summer of 1749.  In an attempt to remove his influence from the ongoing events in the area, Halifax Governor Edward Cornwallis tried to persuade Maillard to retire to Minas Basin.  In apparent response to this pressure, Louis XV awarded Maillard an 800 livre annual pension in 1750, and another assistant (the Abbé Jean Manach) was dispatched to assist Maillard with his workload.  From his mission on Île de la Sainte-Famille, Maillard continued to incite his Mi'kmaq contacts to a state of war until 1758.

To assist the religious efforts Maillard self-financed construction of buildings (beginning 1754) on Île de la Sainte-Famille (now called Chapel Island) in the south of Grand Lac de La Brador, where his main mission was located (he did receive a reimbursement of 3,000 French livres in March 1757).

French and Indian War
During the French and Indian War, Maillard relocated to Malagomich (now known as Merigomish, Nova Scotia) in order to escape the ever-increasing British presence (1758).  He was still there on 26 November 1759, when he and several other French missionaries accepted an offer of peace from British Major Schomberg,  In light of this acceptance, French military officer Jean-François Bourdon de Dombourg dispatched an accusatory dossier against the missionaries to the French Governor of the Canadian Territories, who thereupon accused the missionaries of treason and dispatched (spring 1760) a military officer to Restigouche to investigate.  To this officer Maillard sent a letter detailing the near-hopeless situation of the Mi'kmaq, in which he opened "by summing up 23 years . . spent in this country in the service of our Religion and our Prince."  He had indeed treated for peace with the British because of the hopeless situation, as he tried to explain.

Shortly afterward, Maillard accepted an invitation from Nova Scotia Governor Charles Lawrence to travel to Halifax and assist in pacifying the Mi'kmaq peoples.  He became a British official ("Government Agent to the Indians", with an annual salary of £150).  He asked for (and received) permission to maintain an oratory at a Halifax battery, where he held Catholic services for Acadians and Mi'kmaqs in the area.  In his official capacity Maillard was able to obtain agreement from most of the tribal chiefs to sign peace treaties with the British in Halifax.

Death

In July 1762 Maillard fell seriously ill.  On 12 August he died, attended (at his request) by Anglican clergyman Thomas Wood.  Maillard was accorded a State Funeral by the Nova Scotia Governor; his pallbearers included the Council President and the Speaker of the Assembly.  The government thus recognized his role in negotiating peace treaties between the Mi'kmaq and the British (see Burying the Hatchet Ceremony (Nova Scotia)), and his forceful personality.  He was buried in an unmarked grave in the Old Burying Ground in downtown Halifax. After the St. Peter's Cemetery opened in 1784 as Halifax's first Catholic cemetery, Maillard's grave was moved to St. Peter's where it remains unmarked today under the parking lot built on top of the cemetery.

Reverend Wood wrote of Maillard:

Maillard gave all his belongings away prior to his death.  Most of his books were donated to recognized collections of the time.  His other belongings were bequeathed to Louis Petitpas, his only companion and confidential agent since 1749, and in whose home he lived while in Halifax.

Legacy
As soon as Maillard arrived in Louisbourg, he immersed himself in studying the native language, under the tutelage of his predecessor the Abbé de Saint-Vincent.  Having a remarkable talent for languages, he succeeded within a few months in mastering the difficult-to-pronounce oral language, and during the winter of 1737-38 perfected a system of hieroglyphics to transcribe Mi'kmaq words.  He used these symbols to write formulas for the principal prayers and the responses of the faithful, in the catechism, so his followers might learn them more readily.  In this development he was greatly aided by Jean-Louis Le Loutre, another French missionary.  Le Loutre marveled at Maillard's achievements in his later reports:

Scholars generally agree that Maillard did not invent the Mi'kmaq hieroglyphics.  In 1691 Father Chrétien Le Clercq reported that he had devised a similar method to catechize the Mi'kmaq inhabitants of the Gaspé Peninsula; apparently he had systemized and expanded the Mi'kmaq custom of setting down short messages by using pictograms.  There is no direct evidence that Maillard was aware of Le Clercq's work; in any event Maillard's work is outstanding in that he left numerous works in the language, which continued in use among the Mi'kmaq into the 20th century.

See also 
 Étienne Bâtard
 Military history of Nova Scotia

References

External links 
 
  
 
 Leo Deveau 2007
  Knaves or Knights?" A history of the Spiritan Missionaires in Acadia, 1732-1839. Duquesne University Press. 1962
 

1710 births
1762 deaths
18th-century French Roman Catholic priests
Acadian history
Canadian activists
People of Father Le Loutre's War
Creators of writing systems